White maple may refer to:

 Acer saccharinum, a North American tree also called silver maple
 Wood, especially the sapwood, from a number of Acer species, particularly:
 Acer saccharum, also called the hard or sugar maple